Taonan, formerly Tao'an County, is a county-level city of 100,000 in the northwest of Jilin province in Northeast China. It is under the administration of Baicheng prefecture-level city.

Administrative Divisions
There are 6 subdistricts, 5 towns, 14 townships, and 2 ethnic townships.

Subdistricts:
Tuanjie Subdistrict, Fuwen Subdistrict, Guangming Subdistrict, Xinglong Subdistrict, Yongkang Subdistrict, Tongda Subdistrict

Towns:
Wafang, Wanbao, Heishui, Najin, Anding

Townships:
Wanbao Township, Jubao Township, Moyao Township, Dongsheng Township, Yema Township, Yongmao Township, Xingye Township, Jiaoliuhe Township, Datong Township, Fushun Township, Xinfu Township, Erlong Township, Xiangyang Township, Taofu Township, Hulitu Mongol Ethnic Township, Huhecheli Mongol Ethnic Township

Climate

References

External links

 
Cities in Jilin